Stafford County is the name of two counties in the United States of America:

 Stafford County, Kansas, in Kansas
 Stafford County, Virginia, in Virginia

See also
 Staffordshire, England